King Banana (since the middle of 2009 U-cee & The Royal Family), is a Bavarian reggae Band. The band was founded in June 1995, later other and other musicians joined. The repertoire encloses besides reggae predominantly own compositions of the genres ska, rocksteady, calypso and dancehall.

King Banana was the warmup group of several notable bands, worked together with Stranger Cole in 2002/2003 as well as together with Ken Bob (lead singer of The Eternals.  The band played on more than 350 concerts in six countries., for example at the biggest European ska festival in the Lindenpark in Potsdam-Babelsberg and at the Chiemsee Reggae Summer in Übersee. Singer was Robert Zierhofer (Big Belly Productions). Altogether 46 musicians played in the band until its new formation. King Banana published two single records and five albums.

Band members of U-cee & The Royal Family 
Current members of the new formation U-cee & The Royal Family are:
 Ussama Soleman aka "U-cee" (vocals; before singer of Mortal Kombat Sound)
 Bettina "Tine" Parge aka "Miss Soulstice" (vocals)
 Johannes Frank (guitar)
 Marco Köstler (keyboards, vocals)
 Albèrt Akbaba (guitar)
 Tobias "Tobi" Voges (bass)
 "DJ Rufflow" (DJ, effects)
 Philip Paul Rissettio aka "Pablo" (drums)

External links 
 Band website

References 

German reggae musical groups
German ska groups
Sound systems
Musical groups established in 1995